The Mirama–Kikagati–Nsongezi High Voltage Power Line is a planned high voltage electricity power line, connecting the high voltage substation at Mirama Hills, in the Western Region of Uganda, to another high voltage substation at Kikagati Hydroelectric Power Station and continues to end at Nshungyezi Hydropower Station.

Location
The 132 kilo Volt power line starts at the Uganda Electricity Transmission Company Limited (UETCL) 132kV substation at Mirama Hills, Ntungamo District, in Uganda's Western Region. Due to the steep terrain, the power line does not always follow the winding road. The line measures only , from Mirama Hills to Nshungyezi.

Overview
The power line is being developed to evacuate the 16 megawatts of electricity generated at Kikagati Hydroelectric Power Station and the 39 megawatts generated at Nshungyezi Power Station and transmit it to Mirama Hills, for integration into Uganda's national electricity grid.

Associated power infrastructure
As of August 2020, Kikagati Power Station is under construction at a contract price of US$88 million and an anticipated completion date of 2021. The project received US$12.3 million partial funding from the Uganda GET Fit Program.

The development rights are owned by Maji Power Limited, a subsidiary of Berkeley Energy.

Cost and construction
The power line and associated infrastructure developments are budgeted at US$33.4 million. As of August 2020, construction has not started. It was anticipated that by 2022, the power line would be in operation. Uganda Electricity Transmission Company Limited will own and operate the completed power transmission line. The project received partial funding from the government of Norway.

See also
Energy in Uganda
List of power stations in Uganda

References

External links
 Website of Uganda Electricity Transmission Company Limited
 Strategic plan to increase power supply pays dividends As of 9 October 2012.

High-voltage transmission lines in Uganda
Energy infrastructure in Africa
Energy in Uganda